Dicellopyge is an extinct genus of freshwater ray-finned fish from the Triassic of South Africa. It is characterized by characteristics such as a short, blunt snout and a deeply cleft tail. Two species are known, D. macrodentata and D. lissocephalus, which were contemporaries and differed in scale and tail morphology. It was initially classified in its own family, the Dicellopygidae, but has subsequently been referred to the Palaeoniscidae as a close relative of Acrolepis, Cornuboniscus, Belichthys, and the Amblypteridae. It coexisted with fish such as Lissodus, Elonichthys, Ceratodus, Coelacanthus, Helichthys, Meidiichthys, and Atopocephale.

References

Prehistoric fish genera
Triassic fish of Africa
Anisian genera
Fossil taxa described in 1931